Lewi is an alternative form of Levi (surname) or Levi (given name). It may refer to:

Given name
Lewi Morgan, member of the British band Rixton
Lewi Pethrus (1884-1974), Swedish Pentecostal minister
Lewi Tonks (1897–1971), American quantum physicist
Lewi White, British record producer

Surname
Grant Lewi (1902–1951), American astrologer and author
Joseph Lewi (1820-1897), American physician of Czech Jewish extraction
Paul Lewi (1938–2012), Belgian scientist

See also
 Levi (disambiguation) 
 Levie (disambiguation) 
 Levy (disambiguation) 
 Levis (disambiguation) 
 Lewis (disambiguation)